The Palace of Running Waters is an architecturally significant water pumping station in Buenos Aires, Argentina and the former headquarters of Obras Sanitarias de la Nación. It is currently administered by Agua y Saneamientos Argentinos (AySA).

Overview
The building was designed as a water pumping station in 1877 by Swedish Argentine architect Carlos Nyströmer, and completed in 1894. It was commissioned, in part, to replace the unsightly water tower on Lorea Plaza in what today is Congressional Plaza. Occupying a city block at the northern end of the city's Balvanera section, the Córdoba Avenue landmark still functions as a pumping station. 
The French renaissance palace was covered in over 300,000 glazed, multi-color terra cotta tiles imported from the British ceramics maker, Royal Doulton. It features a tin mansard roof, and is emblazoned with escutcheons representing the 14 Argentine provinces of the time.

The building's entrance is graced by two caryatids, and the property, by landscaped gardens that includes a bust created by Norwegian sculptor Olaf Boye in honor of engineer Guillermo Villanueva, the first Director of the Buenos Aires Water Supply and Drainage Company Limited, the then British-owned municipal water works inaugurated in 1869.

The building was transferred to the City of Buenos Aires following the 1892 nationalization of the British-owned company. The company, eventually known as Obras Sanitarias de la Nación (OSN), was reprivatized in 1993 with a 30-year contract. The contract's rescission in 2006 transferred the property to AySA, a State enterprise, however. The palace still houses a number of AySA offices, Historic Archives and a small water works museum.

The building figures prominently in the book "Santa Evita" by Tomas Eloy Martinez. It is also mentioned in his book "The Tango Singer".

Historic Archive
Established in 1873, this is the only Archive containing complete and specific information about emblematic buildings and water supply planning of Buenos Aires.
This archive is composed by three main Archives.

Water Network Supply Archive

Contains plans about Water treatment plants, sewage and water network supply, drains and projects.
The information found in these plans includes type, size and material of pipes, dates, architectural drawings, etc.
Size of collection: about 60.000 plans, oldest is from 1870.

This archive is not available to the public. Some plans approved for public release were published through books, newspapers and websites.

Water Connection Application Records

Holds a large collection of documents detailing building category, water connection application forms, construction materials, measures, number of pipe connections, names of the owners, etc of almost each building constructed in Buenos Aires.
Many documents are signed by famous and important people of Argentina such as president Bartolome Mitre, physiologist Bernardo Houssay, writer Jorge Luis Borges among others.Size of collection: about 350,000 records.

This Archive is not available to the public. Some documents approved for public release were published through books, newspapers and websites.

Plumbing Plans Archive

Keeps plumbing and fire hydrants service plans of 320,000 land lots of Buenos Aires. These plans are crucial for finding water, drain and sewage connections and fixing water leaks. This archive also preserves plans of buildings demolished during the construction of large avenues and highways of Buenos Aires, e.g. 9 de Julio Avenue. The collection has about 2,800,000 plans, the oldest dating from 1889.

Accesses is to authorized individuals. Some plans were approved for public release, and were published in books, newspapers and websites.

Exterior

Interior

References

External links

 Museum of Water and Health History - Aguas y Saneamientos Argentinos 

Balvanera
Archives in Argentina
Palaces in Buenos Aires
Museums in Buenos Aires
Infrastructure completed in 1894
Water supply pumping stations
Technology museums